The Sino-Steel Tower is a  tall skyscraper on hold in Tianjin, China.  Construction started in 2008 and was originally expected to be complete in 2014. In March 2012, the plaza construction went on hold after the construction commenced, construction was then resumed in 2017.

The building, when completed, will contain offices and a hotel on 80 floors.  The design by MAD Studio, Beijing, is for the building to be clad in white and pierced by recessed hexagonal windows.  Some of the window surrounds will be crimson in colour, causing the building's appearance to alter with the changing light.

References

Skyscraper office buildings in Tianjin
Skyscraper hotels in Tianjin
Skyscrapers in Tianjin
Ma Yansong buildings